BB9 can refer to:

 BB9, a postcode district in the BB postcode area
 Black Brant IX, a Canadian sounding rocket, see Black Brant (rocket)
Big Brother 9, a television programme in various versions